Aluminium acetylacetonate, also referred to as  Al(acac)3, is a coordination complex with formula Al(C5H7O2)3. This aluminium complex with three acetylacetone ligands is used in research on Al-containing materials. The molecule has D3 symmetry, being isomorphous with other octahedral tris(acetylacetonate)s.

Uses
Aluminium acetylacetonate can be used as the precursor to crystalline aluminium oxide films using low-pressure metal organic chemical vapour deposition. In horticulture it can also be used as a molluscicide.

References

Aluminium compounds
Acetylacetonate complexes